This is a list of anchors on Channel 7. Channel 7 is a national free to air TV station in Thailand. Channel 7 is Thailand's most popular TV station and one of only four of Thailand's six major free television channels that operate on a commercial basis with advertising as the main source of revenue.[1] Channel 7 broadcasts a general mix of highly regarded news, entertainment and sports programmes.

News anchors

Current
 Anuwat Fuangthongdang (อนุวัต เฟื่องทองแดง)
 Adisorn Phiungya (อดิสรณ์ พึ่งยา)
 Atthaphon Duangjinda (อรรถพล ดวงจินดา)
 Atthaphon Pinyo (อรรถพล ภิญโญ)
 Baworn Vichaipupipat
 Boonchai Fongkajng
 Buabucha Punnanan (บัวบูชา ปุณณนันท์)
 Chada Somboonpol (ชาดา สมบูรณ์ผล)
 Chaianan Panchu (ชัยอนันต์ ปันชู)
 Choufah Laoaraya (ช่อฟ้า เหล่าอารยะ)
 Gainsit Guntachan (เกณฑ์สิทธิ์ กันธจันทร์)
 Jeeranan Ketpong (จีรนันท์ เขตพงศ์)
 Jetsada Upani (เจษฎา อุปนิ)
 Kammalat Eadsrichai (กมลาสน์ เอียดศรีชาย)
 Krisda Nuanmee (กฤษดา นวลมี)
 Mayuree Paiboonkunlakorn (มยุรี ไพบูลย์กุลกร)
 Mantana Himatthongkam (มัณฑนา หิมะทองคำ)
 Muanfun Prasanpanich (เหมือนฝัน ประสานพานิช)
 Napassakorn Sereerojanasiri (นภัสกรณ์ เสรีโรจนสิริ)
 Natchanon Apasrirat (ณัฐชนน อาภาศรีรัตน์)
 Neeranuch Phraianan (นีรนุช ไพรอนันต์)
 Nilavan Thonglai (นิลาวัณย์ ทองไล้)
 Nicharee Patthong (ณิชารีย์ พัดทอง)
 Nutjitra Piyaksirisak (ณัฐจิตรา ปียะศิริศักด์)
 Pacharee Sompak (พัชรี สมภาค)
 Panurat Saneeboot (ภานุรัจน์ ศนีบุตร)
 Patcharin Suwanwongse (พัชรินทร์ สุวรรณวงศ์)
 Pattarawan Panitcha (ภัทราวรรณ พานิชชา)
 Phikul Kasikam (พิกุล กสิกรรม)
 Phisith Kiratikarnkul (พิสิทธิ์ กิรติการกุล)
 Pinpinut Thakunweeranun (ปิ่นปินัทธ์ ฐากุลวีรนันท์)
 Pimyada Aromsuk (พิมพ์ญาดา อารมย์สุข)
 Premsuda Santiwattana (เปรมสุดา สันติวัฒนา)
 Sajee Wong-ampai (ศจี วงศ์อำไพ)
 Santiphap Mangkornpish (สันติภาพ มังกรพิศม์)
 Siri Saraphon (ศิริ สาระผล)
 Sirikul Attapanyapol (ศิริกุล อัตถปัญญาพล)
 Sompoch Toruksa (สมโภชน์ โตรักษา)
 Sutita Ruangroghiranya (สุฐิตา เรืองรองหิรัญญา)
 Sornsavan Phuvichit (ศรสวรรค์ ภู่วิจิตร)
 Srisuphang Thamavut (ศรีสุภางค์ ธรรมาวุธ)
 Supakit Klangkarn (ศุภกิจ กลางการ)
 Supaporn Thongpaitoon (สุภาพร ทองไพฑูรย์)
 Sukonphet Phonpradittanon (สุคนธ์เพชร ผลประดิษฐานนท์)
 Tanyalak Chatyalak (ธัญลักษณ์ ฉัตรยาลักษณ์)
 Taraiwit
 Teeruch Poparnich (ธีรัช โพธิ์พานิช)
 Thanyanan Laoburin (ธัญนันท์ เหล่าบุรินทร์)
 Visarut Kaltakul (วิศรุด เกาะตรกุล)
 Vanpi Sajjamark (วันปีย์ สัจจมาร์ค)
 Wirach Nuchtaweach (วิรัช นุชตเวช)

Former
 Apisamai Srirangson (อภิสมัย ศรีรังสรรค์)
 Chakrapan Yomjinda (จักรพันธุ์ ยมจินดา)
 Charonchai Salyapong (จรณชัย ศัลยพงษ์)
 Chomphunuch Tanthasetthee (ชมพูนุช ตัณฑเศรษฐี)
 Chongkol Misa (จงกล มิสา)
 Chutchaya Wipoosanawit (ชัชชญา วิภูษณวิทย์)
 Jetsada Jantharanakee (เจษฎา จันทรนาคี)
 Khanittha Sarachuda (ขนิษฐา สาระจูฑะ)
 Kingtong Kaewtae (กิ่งทอง แก้วแท้)
 Kullathida Pongjam (กุลธิดา พงษ์แจ่ม)
 Kunjanita Kunjara Na Ayudhya (กุญชนิตา กุญชร ณ อยุธยา)
 Navanan Bamrungphruk (นวนันท์ บำรุงพฤกษ์)
 Natthapong Muhammad (ณัชฐพงศ์ มูฮำหมัด)
 Natthakarn Sawanyathipat (ณัฐกานต์ สวรรยาธิปัติ)
 Narongdech Srukhosit (ณรงค์เดช สรุโฆษิต)
 Narakorn Tiyayon (นารากร ติยายน)
 Nuengrude Intaramoree (หนึ่งฤดี อินทรโมฬี)
 Nonthikan Faungsumateepong (นนทิกานต์ เฟื่องสุเมธีพงศ์)
 Panraphee Raphiphan (ปานระพี รพิพันธุ์)
 Phasit Aphinyawat (ภาษิต อภิญญาวาท)
 Pat Jungkankul (ภัทร จึงกานต์กุล)
 Phansiri Chitrrat (พรรณสิริ จิตรรัตน์)
 Pongamorn Kumkaew (พงศ์อมร คุ้มแก้ว)
 Photjanat Liamthong (พจนาถ เลี่ยมทอง)
 Phakamas Sahadithakul (ผกามาศ สหดิฎฐกุล)
 Phisanu Nilklad (พิษณุ นิลกลัด)
 Sansanee Nakpong (ศันสนีย์ นาคพงศ์)
 Sasina Wimuttanon (ศศินา วิมุตตานนท์)
 Somruethai Klomnoi (สมฤทัย กล่อมน้อย)
 Suparat Nakbunnam (ศุภรัตน์ นาคบุญนำ)
 Vanphen Saengsiri (วันเพ็ญ แสงศิริ)
 Weerasak Nilklad (วีรศักดิ์ นิลกลัด)
 Waraporn Thipasatian (วราภรณ์ ทิพาเสถียร)
 Watcharaporn Yankomut (วัชราภรณ์ ญาณโกมุท)
 Wichaen Kokitkuson (วิเชียร ก่อกิจกุศล)

Television in Thailand